The New Zealand Railways Road Services (NZRRS) was a branch of the New Zealand Railways Department and later the New Zealand Railways Corporation. It operated long-distance, tourist and suburban bus services and freight trucking and parcel services. Its name was New Zealand Railways Road Motor Service until mid-1936.

History

The first bus operation by NZR began on 1 October 1907, between Culverden on the Waiau Branch and Waiau Ferry in Canterbury. By the 1920s NZR was noticing a considerable downturn in rail passenger traffic on many lines due to increasing ownership of private cars, and from 1923 it began to coordinate rail passenger services with private bus services.

In November 1926, NZR purchased a private bus firm operating between Hastings and Napier in the Hawke's Bay region. NZR then acquired various other bus services in Dunedin and the Hutt Valley, and by 1928 was operating 56 buses. In 1931 Parliament passed the Transport Licensing Act, which regulated local bus services to ensure that services would not compete with NZR. This further increased acquisitions by NZR of small bus companies.

There was a certain amount of rivalry within NZR between NZRRS and the rail Traffic Branch and in many ways they competed with rather than complement each other. For example, many cities had bus terminals some distance from railway stations and many NZRRS routes ran parallel to and at similar times to trains. By 1954 the bus routes covered , but generally at higher fares than the railways. For example, the  Christchurch-Dunedin return journey cost £2 13s 6d by rail, but £3 10s by bus and took 7hr 10min on the fastest train, but 9hr by bus.

Fleet

Early years of the Road Services saw many different brands of buses acquired with the various constituent companies. From Ford Model T-based cars to Straker steam trucks, to various Albion, Cadillac, Dodge and Leyland buses. The builders of the bodies were many and various.

Leading up to World War II, standardisation was the call. During the 1940s Ford V8 and Bedford truck chassis with New Zealand Motor Bodies (NZMB) became the standard NZRRS bus.

In 1950 a 24-seat, forward-control Commer was introduced on the Gisborne-Auckland route. During the 1950s NZRRS began to widely use the Bedford SB chassis fitted with NZMB bodies. So much so, that the Bedford SB was ordered right up until 1980. NZRRS eventually bought 1,240 of these chassis, which were used in suburban, local rural, and long-distance service. This was the largest fleet of Bedford SB buses in the world.

During the late 1970s NZRRS, like many other operators, was having issues with the general reliability of their fleet. Orders were made to Volvo and Hino in an effort to find a better vehicle. Hino and Volvo buses and coaches were purchased right up until the end of the NZRRS.

Restructuring

In 1985 the land operations of NZRC was restructured into market-based bi-modal (road and rail) business groups, rather than branches based on mode of transport, and as part of the new Passenger Business Group, NZRRS was split into three brands:
InterCity - long-haul passenger services
Cityline - urban passenger services
Speedlink - parcels services
The freight trucking business was combined with rail freight into the Freight Business Group, branded Railfreight Systems.

Privatisation
Road and rail services were separated in 1991 when the rail and ferry operations of New Zealand Railways Corporation were transferred to New Zealand Rail Limited and the road transport operations were sold:

InterCity buses was sold in 1991 to InterCity Management Limited, a group of seven of the largest private coach companies - Whangarei Bus Company, Bayline Group, Ritchies Transport, Tranzit Group, Pacific Tourways, Gutherys Coachlines and Nelson SBL
Cityline in Wellington and Auckland to Wellington City Transport and subsequently to Stagecoach; in Dunedin to Newton's Coachways; New Plymouth to Waitara taken over by Withatruck Coachlines
Speedlink Parcels was sold to New Zealand Post.

References

Citations

Bibliography

External links 
 Alexander Turnbull Library photos - NZRRS Bedford bus - inside, front and back

Bus companies of New Zealand
Bus transport brands
Public transport in New Zealand
Transport companies established in 1907
New Zealand companies established in 1907